The Wapabara, also known as Woppaburra, are an Aboriginal Australian people whose traditional lands are on Greater and South Keppel islands. They are known in their speech as Ganumi Bara. They are often considered to be a branch of the Darumbal.
https://m.imdb.com/title/tt14228894/?ref_=ext_shr_lnk

Language
Though often thought to have spoken the Darumbal language, an early settler of the island, Robert Ross, stated that their language was unintelligible to the mainland Aboriginal people.

According to an early sojourner, C. T. Wyndham, the language spoken was divided into two distinct dialects, northern and southern. This was disputed by another white informant who said that mainland Aboriginal people in that area could understand the Woppaburra language.
https://www.abc.net.au/radionational/programs/awaye/features/word-up/word-up/9379804

Ecology and Lifestyle
The Woppaburra were described by white settlers as small in stature, the hair of a reddish-brown tint, and their bodies covered in downy hair and living predominantly in natural caverns, and subsisting on a diet of fish and tubers since natural land game, such as kangaroos, opossums and wallabies, was absent from the island. Their numbers, as pastoral lease-holders began to establish a foothold on their territory in the 1860s, were believed to be about 60 people, and W. T. Wyndham reported later that during his own sojourn on the island in 1883–4, he counted 54. Archibald Meston in 1902 estimated the original population before contact to be around 200. Disparities overall numbers may reflect headcounts for the separate islands, and Rowland makes an estimate of the total Woppaburra before contact to be around 60 on South Keppel and a further 25 on the northern island.

Anthropometrics
Anthropometric studies have suggested the Woppaburra are quite distinct from the mainland peoples, one 1976 study concluding that, their bone remains constitute the "most striking instance we have seen of micro-evolution” within the Australian Aboriginal people.

History
According to Michael Rowland, an authority on the Woppaburra writing in part to reply to the skepticism about reports of genocide advanced by Keith Windschuttle, the first visit of whites to the island, in 1865, occasioned a massacre of seven/eight members of the tribe: not mentioned in the report of the expedition, which spoke of an incident in which a fleeing Aboriginal woman had been saved by the group after she fell into the sea and injured herself, this or perhaps an earlier occasion of slaughter, was pointed out by tribal people later, who showed a hundred-yard line pitted with the skeletal remains of the Woppaburra who had been killed, and several males, accused of killing some sheep, were transported off the terrain, to Yeppoon, where the local tribes viewed them with hostility. The then lessee however stated that a full 30 had been removed, at their request, to the mainland, and relocated, after landing at a place 10 miles south of Cape Manifold, at the Water Park Native Reserve, while leaving only two women behind. Robert Ross's pastoral lease ran 3–4,000 sheep on island. Another white version at the time (1883) claimed that the Woppaburra were not native to the island but had managed, being part of a mainland tribe, to get over to the island and kill a 100 sheep, and that this accounted for their removal. According to testimony given to Walter Roth, however, some whites and mainland blacks had descended on the island, and hunted up all the Woppaburra women and children they could find, and had them transported back to the coast. "Human lives were sacrificed for sheep," was his conclusion. Ross may have shifted them to the mainland to supply cheap labour for property at Taranganba.

Deracinated on the mainland, and unable to adapt to Yeppoon conditions, where they eventually were said to have retired to, reports quickly noted that the transported group was rapidly dying off -though one man, Yoolowa/Lowoo, was said to have swum back to Keppel island and others were eaten by sharks in attempts to get back to their homeland- as a result of "coast fever" and an inability to live off the different diet. Corpses of Woppaburra were found here and there in scrubland and along the beaches. Reports from the mid-1880s indicate that some Woppaburra remained on the island, used as cheap labour on the sheep-runs, men and women whipped along as, harnassed to a plough, they were forced to furrow the soil, and fed tidbits thrown their way by whites. They were chained to a tidal cave if they refused to work.

Something akin to frontier warfare, involving not only shootings, poisonings, and being driven into the sea, but also theft of their women by Japanese pearlers, appears to have struck the Woppaburra, according to the tales handed down by descendants of the tribe in both Yeppoon and Emu Park

Ross's Keppel interests were taken over by his foreman, James Lucas, in 1897 and he moved the Woppaburra to South Keppel island near his homestead. At the same time, in the late 1890s, a dispute over territorial competence arose between the northern protector of Queensland's aboriginal peoples, and his southern colleague Archibald Meston. Roth insisted they not be dislocated from the islands, and was thought to favour the lessee's interests, while Meston was shocked by the degraded conditions to which the Woppaburra had been reduced in the introduced pastoralist environment. Roth reported 19 Woppaburra people on the island in 1898, 3 of them male, and 16 female, a disparity he attributed to the character of the Europeans who frequented the isle. Meston wanted them shifted to Fraser Island to isolate them from sexually predatory whites and fishermen.

The remaining members of the Woppaburra were forcibly removed from the island in 1902, though one descendant claims his family was removed 8 years later, in 1910. The skeletal remains of 2 Woppaburra people were removed to museum holdings in London, in the 1920s, and were conserved at the Royal College of Surgeons and London's Natural History Museum. In the early 1980s The Keppel Islands Lifestyle Aborigninal Corporation (K.I.L.A.C) was formed by the initiative of Woppaburra descendants Elders Aunty Glenice Croft, Aunty Linette Van Issum, Uncle Robert Barney, Aunty Ethel Richards, Aunty Heather Saunders, Aunty Ruthy Cummings and their children Michelle Croft, Angela & Sonny Van Issum. When the K.I.L.A.C media person Aunty Glenice Croft contacted Michael Rowland after media coverage about Mr Rowland's archaeological survey on the Keppel Islands, he met Aunty Ethel Richards, Aunty Glenice Croft and others. This led to the first Woppaburra reunion return in 1984 when 40 descendants met up on Great Keppel island.

Native title
On 3 December 2021 the Woppaburra people were formally recognised as native title holders.

Their native title determination area covers 567 square kilometres and includes Woppa (Great Keppel formerly known as South Keppel) and Konomie (North Keppel)

Almost 120 years ago, the Woppaburra people were forcibly removed from their islands in central Queensland, enduring deep suffering, but in a historic ruling on 3 December 2021 the Woppaburra Peoples were recognised as native title holders, proving their unwavering connection to the Keppel Islands and waters of the Great Barrier Reef - Queensland, Australia.

"Woppaburra People are the only native title group to be removed from country for over 80 years and to achieve exclusive native titles rights over our country."

On 7 March 2014, the registration of a claim to native title made in November 2013 in the name of descendants of the Woppaburra was accepted by the National Native Title Tribunal.

We Al-li
The term we al-li was adopted from the Woppaburra language to describe a therapy program devised for indigenous peoples affected by the historic traumas of dispossession, informed by the work of Alice Miller as well as by the need to provide a culturally safe environment in which people could "intellectualise" or make sense of their experiences. We means "fire" and refers to both the symbolism of raging anger and its use in cleansing the earth to make way for new spring growth, in turn referring to the sacred responsibilities of taking care of country and also of people. Al-li means "water" and refers to both the symbolism of deep grieving and its essential life-giving and healing properties, in the form of rain and the ways it moves through the landscape, following the tracks of Moonda Nghadda. Taken together, we al-li describes the great anger and pain felt in the self and for others, the cleansing process crucial to recovery and regeneration, the grieving process necessary to restore the health of the community, and the healing process that results.

Descendants
Some 300 Australians trace their origins to the Woppaburra of the Keppel Islands.
 Konomie Richards (1883/5-1973), native name, Boombilwan, died, aged 90. at Acacia Ridge, Brisbane in 1973. Many indigenous Queenslanders are related to her.
 Ethel Richards, the daughter of Konomie, was still alive in 2004.
 Chrissy Hansen-Doherty.
 Albert Ross last initiated young Woppaburra male removed 1900s, his daughter is Lillian C.Ross her traditional name is Kalulu which means Yellow Waterlilly) she had eleven children. Alive are Linette Russ, Gordon Barney, Glenice Croft, Bess Catley, Valmai Burns, Christine Williams and Vanessa Rogers.

Notes

Citations

Sources

Aboriginal communities in Queensland